Tegostoma pseudonoctua is a moth in the family Crambidae. It was described by Rothschild in 1921. It is found in Niger.

References

Odontiini
Moths described in 1921
Moths of Africa
Taxa named by Walter Rothschild